Charles Edward Hinton Jr. (May 3, 1934 – January 27, 2013) was an American professional baseball player. An outfielder, Hinton played in Major League Baseball for the Washington Senators (1961–64), Cleveland Indians (1965–67, 1969–71) and California Angels (1968).

In an eleven-season career, Hinton posted a .264 batting average with 113 home runs and 443 runs batted in in 1353 games played.

Playing career
Hinton attended Shaw University, where he played baseball, American football, and basketball for the Shaw Bears. He served for two years in the United States Army.

In 1956, Hinton attended a baseball tryout camp, where he signed a contract with the Baltimore Orioles. He won two minor-league batting championships in the Orioles system, playing with the Aberdeen Pheasants of Class C Northern League in 1959 and the Stockton Ports of the Class C California League in 1960. The Orioles promoted Hinton to the Vancouver Mounties of the Class AAA Pacific Coast League during the 1960 season. Afraid they might lose Hinton in the 1960 Major League Baseball (MLB) expansion draft, the Orioles had Hinton fake a shoulder injury during winter league baseball. Despite this, the Washington Senators selected Hinton in the expansion draft.

The Senators optioned Hinton to the Indianapolis Indians of the Class AAA American Association before the regular season began. They promoted Hinton from the minor leagues on May 14, 1961, and he made his MLB debut the next day. He finished the 1961 season with a .260 batting average. In 1962, he had a .310 batting average, good for fourth in the American League, and finished second in stolen bases to Luis Aparicio.  Hit in the head with a pitch on September 5, 1963, Hinton was unconscious when he was carried off the field. He returned to the lineup eight days later, but felt limited by symptoms of the concussion. Hinton was named to represent the American League in the 1964 MLB All-Star Game.

After the 1964 season, the Senators traded Hinton to the Cleveland Indians for Bob Chance and Woodie Held. He was dealt to the California Angels for José Cardenal on November 29, 1967. Hinton batted .195 in the 1968 season with the Angels. Just before the 1969 season, the Angels traded Hinton back to the Indians for Lou Johnson. The Indians released Hinton after the 1971 season. In all, Hinton played six years with the Indians.

Post-playing career
From 1972 to 2000, Hinton was head coach for the Howard University baseball team. Hinton led the Bison to their first Mid-Eastern Athletic Conference championship.

In 1982, he founded the Major League Baseball Players Alumni Association (MLBPAA), a non-profit organization which promotes the game of baseball, raises money for charities, inspires and educates youth through positive sport images and protects the dignity of the game through former players.

Personal
Hinton and his wife, Irma, lived in Washington, D.C. They had four children. He died from complications of Parkinson's disease on January 27, 2013.

Highlights
1964 American League All-Star
Two hitting-streaks in 1962 (17 and 15 games)
Fourth in the 1962 American League batting title (.310), behind Pete Runnels (.326), Mickey Mantle (.321) and Floyd Robinson (.312)
Three times led the Washington Senators in batting average (1962–64), four times in triples and stolen bases (1961–64), and was the last Senator to hit .300
His uniform number 32 is honored in the Washington Wall of Stars

References

External links

 Chuck Hinton - Baseballbiography.com

1934 births
2013 deaths
Aberdeen Pheasants players
African-American baseball coaches
African-American baseball players
American League All-Stars
Baseball players from North Carolina
Baseball players from Washington, D.C.
Burials at Quantico National Cemetery
California Angels players
Cleveland Indians players
College baseball coaches
Howard Bison baseball coaches
Indianapolis Indians players
Major League Baseball outfielders
Phoenix Stars players
Shaw Bears baseball players
Sportspeople from Rocky Mount, North Carolina
Stockton Ports players
Vancouver Mounties players
Washington Senators (1961–1971) players
20th-century African-American sportspeople
21st-century African-American people